Federica Selva (born June 7, 1996 in Borgo Maggiore) is a Sammarinese alpine skier. She competed for San Marino at the 2014 Winter Olympics in the giant slalom competition, and became the first female athlete to represent the country at the Winter Olympics as well.

See also
San Marino at the 2014 Winter Olympics

References

1996 births
Living people
Olympic alpine skiers of San Marino
Alpine skiers at the 2014 Winter Olympics
Sammarinese female alpine skiers